Heliosia is a genus of moths in the family Erebidae erected by George Hampson in 1900.

Species

Status unclear
 Heliosia flava Bang-Haas, 1927

References

External links

Nudariina
Moth genera